The Nasher Museum of Art (previously the Duke University Museum of Art) is the art museum of Duke University, and is located on Duke's campus in Durham, North Carolina, United States. The Nasher, along with Dartmouth's Hood Museum of Art and Princeton's Art Museum, has been recognized as a place that "raises the cultural bar" on college campuses.

History 
In 1936, art collector William Hayes Ackland wrote letters to three universities, attempting to find a place to bequest his collection to upon his death. Duke University President William Preston Few was receptive to this idea, and had plans drawn up for an art museum at Duke. After the death of both Few and Ackland, Duke refused to accept the gift, for reasons still not disclosed. Ackland's estate had to posthumously find a new location to build a museum, eventually creating the Ackland Art Museum.

In 1969, the university established the Duke University Museum of Art on Duke's East Campus with medieval art from the Ernest Brummer Collection.

In the later twentieth century, there was a push to move the location of the museum to a more central location. Professors of botany fought the plan because the new location would disturb the "botanical study area," a field of plants.

In the early twenty-first century, in part from a gift by alumnus Raymond Nasher, the museum became known as the Nasher Museum of Art and opened a new $24 million museum  designed by architect Rafael Viñoly. Since its reopening, annual attendance is about 100,000 visitors.

Mary D.B.T., great-granddaughter of Benjamin Newton Duke, brother of James Buchanan Duke, and James H. Semans were major contributors to the university art museum.  From 1987 to 2003, Michael Mezzatesta was the director and oversaw the construction of the museum's new site. Sarah Schroth, former Nancy Hanks Senior Curator, is the director of the museum.

Collection 
The collection contains more than 13,000 works of art, including works by Nina Chanel Abney, Ai Weiwei, John Akomfrah, Njideka Akunyili Crosby, Emma Amos (painter), Firelei Báez, Radcliffe Bailey, Maria Berrio, Sanford Biggers, Christian Boltanski, Mel Chin, William Cordova, Marlene Dumas, Darío Escobar, Genevieve Gaignard, Jeffrey Gibson, Barkley L. Hendricks,  Rashid Johnson, Taiyo Kimura, Christian Marclay, Kerry James Marshall, Zanele Muholi, Wangechi Mutu, Odili Donald Odita, Maia Cruz Palileo, Ebony G. Patterson, Dan Perjovschi, Michelangelo Pistoletto, Robin Rhode, Dario Robleto, Amy Sherald, Xaviera Simmons, Lorna Simpson, Jaune Quick-to-See Smith, Eve Sussman, Henry Taylor (artist), Alma Thomas, Hank Willis Thomas, Mickalene Thomas, Bob Thompson, Kara Walker, Nari Ward, Carrie Mae Weems, Kehinde Wiley, Fred Wilson and Lynette Yiadom Boakye. The museum is dedicated to presenting contemporary art from around the world, with particular attention given to those who have been historically underrepresented. Founding director Kimberly Rorschach left for Seattle Art Museum in November 2012.

The museum has a strong collection of Pre-Columbian art (3,300 objects), with particularly significant holdings of Mayan ceramics and Peruvian textiles.

Selected exhibitions
 Wangechi Mutu: A Fantastic Journey 

March 21, 2013 – July 21, 2013

The Nasher Museum of Art at Duke University has organized Wangechi Mutu’s first survey in the United States, the most comprehensive and innovative show yet for this internationally renowned, multidisciplinary artist. Wangechi Mutu: A Fantastic Journey presents more than 50 works from the mid-1990s to the present, including collage, drawing, sculpture, installation and video. The exhibition features many of the artist’s most iconic collages drawn from major international collections, rarely seen early works and new creations. The exhibition also unveils the artist’s sketchbooks of intimate drawings that reveal her creative process and inspirations, on public view for the first time. Other new highlights include Mutu’s first-ever animated video, The End of eating Everything, created in collaboration with Santigold, commissioned by the Nasher Museum. Mutu also will transform the gallery into an environmental installation, including a monumental wall drawing, which allows visitors to immerse themselves in the artist's work. The exhibition is curated by Trevor Schoonmaker, Chief Curator and Patsy R. and Raymond D. Nasher Curator of Contemporary Art.

 The Record: Contemporary Art and Vinyl 

September 2, 2010 – February 6, 2011

This is the first museum exhibition to explore the culture of vinyl records within the history of contemporary art. Bringing together forty-one artists from around the world who have worked with records as their subject or medium, this groundbreaking exhibition examines the record’s transformative power in the years from the 1960s to the present. Through sound work, sculpture, installation, drawing, painting, photography, video, and performance, The Record combines contemporary art with outsider art, audio with visual, fine art with popular culture, and established artists with those exhibiting in a U.S. museum for the first time. The 41 artists in the exhibition include Laurie Anderson, David Byrne, Janet Cardiff, William Cordova, Jeroen Diepenmaat, Jasper Johns, Jack Goldstein, Taiyo Kimura, Ralph Lemon, Christian Marclay, Mingering Mike, Dave Muller, Vik Muniz, 9th Wonder, DJ Rekha, Robin Rhode, Dario Robleto, Ed Ruscha, Malick Sidibe, Xaviera Simmons, Su-Mei Tse, and Carrie Mae Weems. The exhibition is curated by Trevor Schoonmaker.

 Barkley L. Hendricks: Birth of the Cool 

February 7, 2008 – July 13, 2008

This exhibit is the first career painting retrospective of renowned American artist Barkley L. Hendricks. Born in 1945 in Philadelphia, Hendricks' unique work resides at the nexus of American realism and post-modernism, a space somewhere between portraitists Chuck Close and Alex Katz and pioneering black conceptualists David Hammons and Adrian Piper. He is best known for his stunning, life-sized portraits of people of color from the urban northeast. Cool, empowering and sometimes confrontational, Hendricks' artistic privileging of a culturally complex black body has paved the way for today's younger generation of artists who are deeply indebted to him. This exhibition of Hendricks' paintings includes work from 1964 to the present. The exhibition will travel to the Studio Museum in Harlem, the Santa Monica Museum (Los Angeles,)the Pennsylvania Academy of Fine Arts in Philadelphia, and the Contemporary Arts Museum in Houston. There is a definitive full-color exhibition catalogue with over 160 reproductions, edited by the Nasher Museum's curator of contemporary art Trevor Schoonmaker.

 El Greco to Velazquez: Art during the Reign of Philip III 

August 21, 2008 – November 9, 2008

The Nasher Museum collaborated with the Museum of Fine Arts, Boston to present this groundbreaking exhibition – the first in the US to focus on Spanish art of the period between 1598 and 1621. The show examines a fascinating period bookended by the two giants of Spanish painting: the late works of El Greco and the early paintings of Velázquez. The exhibition is the culmination of 20 years of research by Sarah Schroth, the Nasher Museum's senior curator.

This exhibition includes some 120 paintings, sculptures and decorative art pieces, representing 20 artists. The masters will be seen in context with lesser-known artists working during this time in Spain. The show will bring together works of art from museums around the world, some of which rarely travel outside of their countries, creating a unique opportunity for American audiences. Key loans from the Metropolitan Museum of Art, the Museo del Prado, the Kunsthistorisches Museum, Vienna, and the National Gallery of Art, among other institutions and private lenders, were secured.

References

External links
Nasher Museum of Art website
ArtDaily coverage of the Nasher's opening

Duke University campus
Art museums and galleries in North Carolina
Museums in Durham, North Carolina
University museums in North Carolina
Mesoamerican art museums in the United States
Pre-Columbian art museums in the United States
Institutions accredited by the American Alliance of Museums
Art museums established in 2005
Buildings and structures completed in 2005
2005 establishments in North Carolina
Rafael Viñoly buildings
Modernist architecture in North Carolina